Owl Pharaoh is the debut solo mixtape by American rapper Travis Scott (then stylized as Travi$ Scott). It was released on May 21, 2013, on the iTunes Store and available for free download by Grand Hustle Records and Epic Records. The mixtape features guest appearances from T.I., Wale, Toro y Moi, A$AP Ferg, Theophilus London, Paul Wall, James Fauntleroy and Meek Mill.

Background
In 2011, Scott announced Owl Pharaoh as an 11-track extended play, with 2 bonus tracks. This version was to include songs such as "Lights (Love Sick)", "Analogue" and "That B!tch Crazy". However, this was before Scott was scouted by highly acclaimed rappers  and record executives T.I. and Kanye West. After working with the two, respectively, and reconstructing the project, Scott then announced Owl Pharaoh would be released the same month as GOOD Music's Cruel Summer (2012). However, that release did not occur. Scott then once again reworked on the project, and set a new date for February 22, 2013. Again, the project was not released.

After creating moderate buzz being named as a part of XXL Magazine's Freshman Class of 2013, Scott set another date for May 21, 2013, while also announcing that it will be for sale on iTunes soon after. He also stated that he might also release it for free prior to that date. Travis Scott has credited Kanye West, T.I. and Bon Iver frontman Justin Vernon for helping him shape the project. For the mixtape Scott collaborated with artists such as Kanye West, T.I., 2 Chainz, Justin Vernon, Wale, Common, Toro y Moi, and Gunplay. The final track listing also revealed features from Theophilus London, ASAP Ferg, James Fauntleroy and Paul Wall. Common and Gunplay would not be featured. MTV revealed that Travis would be dropping the EP free of charge on May 21 and an iTunes release would be cancelled.

Release and promotion
Owl Pharaoh was set to be released as a free download in 2012. However, the project was delayed, and was announced to be slated for a later release. The project was later re-created by Kanye West and Mike Dean, and was then again delayed for sample clearance issues. In promotion Travis Scott released the track, "Blocka La Flame", a remix of fellow GOOD Music label-mate Pusha T's single "Blocka" featuring Jamaican dancehall recording artist Popcaan (which features production and vocals from Travis Scott). The song was produced by Young Chop, with additional production by Scott himself, alongside Mike Dean.

The second song released from the mixtape was "Quintana" featuring fellow rapper Wale. It was released on March 22, 2013. The production was handled by Sak Pase, Anthony Kilhoffer and Scott himself. The song was also accompanied with a video, which features Scott burning in a raging fire, wearing a straitjacket.

On March 29, 2013, following his interview with British disc jockey, DJ Semtex, Scott premiered a snippet of his commercial debut single which serviced as the lead single "Upper Echelon" featuring 2 Chainz and Grand Hustle label-head T.I. (the mixtape version only included T.I.). The song was released on April 18, 2013 and was officially released on iTunes the next day. On June 16, 2013, the music video was released for "Upper Echelon" featuring T.I. and 2 Chainz. The production was handled by Anthony Kilhoffer, J Gramm and Travis Scott himself.

Critical reception

Owl Pharaoh was met with critical acclaim from music critics. Ralph Bristout of XXL gave the album an XL, saying "While he’s still finding himself lyrically, his work behind the boards and eagerness to try new things keep this from becoming problematic. Perhaps Owl Pharaoh’s sole drawback is that it still doesn’t quite seem to answer the question 'Who exactly is Travi$ Scott?' Luckily for him, this incredibly cohesive debut is so mesmerizing that everyone should want to find out."

Owl Pharaoh was nominated for Best Mixtape at the 2013 BET Hip Hop Awards. Spin ranked it at number 21, on their list of the "40 Best Hip-Hop Albums of 2013." They commented saying, "The sneering attitude dripping through muffled Auto-Tune and dark streaks of "Uptown" and "Bad Mood / Shit On You" are a very distinct brand of dark and twisted, but certainly not a fantasy." XXL named it the fifth best mixtape of 2013. They elaborated saying, "Above all things, the 2013 XXL Freshman’s production skills is on full display, presenting his wide range of sound. Owl Pharaoh is an early sign that the potential for him is monumental."

Accolades

Track listing

Notes
 signifies an additional producer
 signifies a co-producer
Soundcloud released version contains the song 16 Chapels

References

2013 mixtape albums
Grand Hustle Records albums
Albums produced by Lex Luger
Albums produced by Emile Haynie
Albums produced by Kanye West
Albums produced by Young Chop
Albums produced by Travis Scott
Albums free for download by copyright owner
Albums produced by DJ Dahi
Albums produced by WondaGurl
Travis Scott albums